Stara Kaletka  (until 1827 Kaletka) is a village in the administrative district of Gmina Purda, within Olsztyn County, Warmian-Masurian Voivodeship, in northern Poland. It is located within the historic region of Warmia.

The village has a population of 210.

References

Stara Kaletka